The 1903 Chorley by-election was held on 4 November 1903 when the incumbent Conservative MP, David Lindsay, was made Lord Commissioner of the Treasury.  It was retained by Lindsay.

References

By-elections to the Parliament of the United Kingdom in Lancashire constituencies
Ministerial by-elections to the Parliament of the United Kingdom
Politics of Chorley
November 1903 events
1903 elections in the United Kingdom
1903 in England
1900s in Lancashire